The following outline is provided as an overview of and topical guide to stagecraft:

Stagecraft – technical aspect of theatrical, film, and video production. Stagecraft is distinct from the wider scope of scenography. Considered a technical rather than an artistic field, it relates primarily to the practical implementation of a designer's artistic vision.

Essence of stagecraft 

Stagecraft
 Cue (theatrical)
 Curtain Call
 Rehearsal
 Stage
 Theatrical constraints
 Theatrical superstitions
 Technical rehearsal
 Technical week
 Performance

Branches of stagecraft

Lighting

Lighting design
Lighting involves the process of determining the size, intensity, shape, and color of light for a given scene.   Typical work includes hanging, focusing, procurement and maintenance of fixtures as well as some aspects of show control.

Electrician (theatre)
Color temperature 
Intelligent lighting - LED stage lighting - Light plot - Stage lighting - Stage lighting instrument - Stage lighting accessories

Audio

Sound design
Sound, which can include musical underscoring, vocal and instrument mixing as well as theatrical sound effects.

Audio engineering
Microphone - Sound - Smiley face curve

Carpentry

set construction
Carpentry is the process of building scenery, which can include scenic painting and soft goods (drapes and stage curtains).  Scenic carpentry also covers mechanics: the design, engineering and operation of Fly system scenery or flying of performers and mechanised scenic elements.

Carpenter (theatre)
Counterweight fly system - Rail (theater) - Rigging (theatre) - Scene shop -
Scenery wagon - show control - Theatrical scenery

Props

Theatrical property
Props, which includes furnishings, set dressings, and all items large and small which cannot be classified as scenery, electrics or wardrobe. Some crossover may apply. Props handled by actors are known as hand props, and props which are kept in an actor's costume are known as personal props.

Costumes

costume construction
Costuming, known as the Wardrobe department, is responsible for costume design, construction and the procurement and maintenance of costumes.

Make-up artist - Wigs

Positions in Stagecraft

Management 
Stage management
Technical director
Production management (theatre)
House management
Company management

Technical 
Carpenter (theatre)
Electrician (theatre)
Fly crew
Property master
Pyrotechnician
Running crew
Spotlight operator
Stagehand
Theatrical Technician
Technical crew
Wardrobe supervisor

Design 
 Costume Designer
Lighting designer
Scenic designer
 Sound Designer
 Video design

Stagecraft organizations 
 International Alliance of Theatrical Stage Employees
 PLASA
 United Scenic Artists
 United States Institute for Theatre Technology

History of stagecraft 

History of stagecraft
2007 Broadway stagehand strike

General stagecraft concepts 
Parts of a theatre

Terminology 

Bobbinet - McCandless method - Spike (stagecraft) - Tannoy
 Theatrical production
 Film production
 Video production

Important technology 

ACN - C-Clamp (stagecraft) - Color gel - Color scroller - Dimmer - DMX512
Fog machine - Followspot - Footlight - Gobo (lighting) - Haze machine  - Parabolic aluminized reflector light - Safety curtain - XLR connector

Venues 
Broadway theatre - Regional theatre in the United States - community theatre

Persons influential in the field of stagecraft 
Dale Ferguson - Designer
Neil Peter Jampolis - Lighting and Set
 Samuel James Hume - Organizer of the first exhibition of stagecraft in the United States.

Costume Designers 
Jane Greenwood - Paul Tazewell

Lighting Designers 

List of lighting designers
Andrew Bridge - Howell Binkley - Luc Lafortune - Mark Henderson - Nigel Levings - Paul Gallo - Richard Riddell - Tharon Musser

Set Designers 
Allen Moyer - Carl Toms - Donald Oenslager - John Conklin - John Napier

Sound Designers 
Paul Arditti

Technical Directors 
Wayne Nakasone

Awards 
Dora Mavor Moore Award
TEC Awards
Tony Award for Best Stage Technician
Laurence Olivier Award for Best Set Designer

Stagecraft lists 

List of theatre personnel
Running crew

References

External links 

 1

Stagecraft
Stagecraft
Stage terminology